Robert Scott (c. 1569 – 1620) was an English churchman and academic, Master of Clare College, Cambridge and Dean of Rochester.

Life
He was baptized in 1569 at Barnston, Essex, and matriculated as sizar at Pembroke College, Cambridge in 1588. He graduated B.A. in 1592, and M.A. from Clare College in 1595.

He reportedly had been a Fellow of Trinity College, Cambridge. He was sub-almoner to King James at the time of his election in 1612 as Master of Clare. He proceeded D.D. in 1613.

In 1615 he was appointed Dean of Rochester, and he served as Vice-Chancellor of Cambridge for 1619-20 . He died in London, on 21 December 1620 and was buried at Barnston.

References

1569 births
1620 deaths
16th-century English clergy
17th-century English clergy
Alumni of Clare College, Cambridge
Deans of Rochester
Masters of Clare College, Cambridge
People from Uttlesford (district)
Vice-Chancellors of the University of Cambridge